Jean Courtecuisse (c.1350, Le Mans - 4 March 1423, Geneva) was a French bishop and theologian, who was elected bishop of Paris and bishop of Geneva.

Life
He received a doctorate in theology and taught it in Paris. He was king's almoner from 1408 onwards and served as chancellor in Jean de Gerson's absence. In 1409 he became a canon of Notre Dame Cathedral. He was elected bishop of Paris in 1420 but was forced to leave the bishopric and hide at abbaye de Saint-Germain-des-Prés after displeasing Henry V of England, then master of the city. In 1422-23 he was transferred to the bishopric of Geneva, which he held until his death.

Courtecuisse was a prolific writer, leaving sermons in Latin and French, several theological works and a treatise entitled On Faith and the Church (Tractatus de fide et Ecclesia, Romano pontifice et concilii generali). The Bibliothèque de Genève has a manuscript translation by him of Formula vitæ honestæ ; De quattuor virtutibus by Martin of Braga, entitled Le livre Senecque des quatre vertus cardinalz.

References

Sources 
A. P. J. Pictet de Sergy, Genève, origine et développement de cette république, Tome second, Ch. Gruaz, Genève, 1849.

Bishops of Paris
14th-century French Catholic theologians
15th-century French Catholic theologians
1350 births
1423 deaths
15th-century French Roman Catholic bishops